Bagnolet is a commune in the eastern suburbs of Paris, France.

History
On 1 January 1860, the city of Paris was enlarged by annexing neighboring communes. On that occasion, a small part of the commune of Bagnolet was annexed to the city of Paris. At the same time, the commune of Charonne was disbanded and divided between the city of Paris, Bagnolet, and Montreuil. Bagnolet received a small part of the territory of Charonne.

On 24 July 1867, a part of the territory of Bagnolet was detached and merged with a part of the territory of Romainville and a part of the territory of Pantin to create the commune of Les Lilas.

The town used to be the home of the Château de Bagnolet.

Population
Its inhabitants are called Bagnoletais.

Transport
Bagnolet is served by Gallieni station on Paris Metro line 3 and RATP buslines 76,102,115,122,318 545.

International and National coaches serve Bagnolet at Gallieni Metro station.

Notable people
Sylvain Distin, footballer
Koffi Djidji, footballer
Eduardo Fraschini, cinematographer
Henri Verneuil, filmmaker
Cyril Kongo, French graffiti artist

Support for Georges Ibrahim Abdallah 
In December 2013, the city's council voted to make Georges Ibrahim Abdallah an "honorary resident." The city council's motion (which did not mention Abdallah's role in the murder of Charles R. Ray) described him as a “communist activist” and a “political prisoner” who “belongs to the resistance movement of Lebanon" and is a "determined defender of the Palestinian just cause." The motion stated that Abdallah's release was being denied “primarily because of the intervention of the US government" and "To call for his liberation, the municipal council declares him an honorary citizen of Bagnolet."

In July 2014, the administrative court in Montreuil revoked the city's motion to grant Abdallah honorary citizenship.

Education
The commune has ten public preschools (maternelles), nine public elementary schools, two public junior high schools (collèges), and a comprehensive public senior high school (lycée polyvalent).
 Junior high schools: Georges-Politzer and Travail / Langevin
 Lycée général et professionnel Eugène-Hénaff

There is a private junior and high school, Lycée professionnel et technologique Saint-Besnoît de l'Europe.

International relations

Bagnolet is twinned with:

 Akbou, Algeria
 Massala, Mali
 Oranienburg, Germany
 Le Robert, Martinique, France
 Shatila, Lebanon
 Sesto Fiorentino, Italy

See also

Communes of the Seine-Saint-Denis department

References

External links

Official website (in French)

Communes of Seine-Saint-Denis